Jonathan Stark won in the final 6–4, 6–4 against Michael Chang.

Seeds
A champion seed is indicated in bold text while text in italics indicates the round in which that seed was eliminated.

  Michael Chang (final)
  Richard Krajicek (quarterfinals)
  Paul Haarhuis (first round)
  Mark Woodforde (second round)
  Todd Woodbridge (first round)
  Sjeng Schalken (second round)
  Byron Black (second round)
  Hendrik Dreekmann (first round)

Draw

References
 1996 Singapore Open Draw

Singapore Open (men's tennis)
1996 ATP Tour
1996 in Singaporean sport